Shiwe may refer to
Shiwe language of central Gabon
Shiwe Nogwanya (born 1994), South African football striker

See also
Shive (disambiguation)